Rigsdaler is a unit of currency.

Rigsdaler may refer to:
 Danish rigsdaler
 Danish West Indian rigsdaler
 Greenlandic rigsdaler
 Norwegian rigsdaler

See also
 Swedish riksdaler